The Law Secretary of Pakistan is the Federal Secretary for the Ministry of Law and Justice and the Chief Law officer of the Government of Pakistan. Traditionally, the position of Secretary has been filled by retired Judges of the Supreme Court, High Courts or by a seasoned lawyer, and not by career civil servants of Grade 22 like in other Federal Ministries. The current Law Secretary is Raja Naeem Akbar.

The Secretary, based in Islamabad, plays a vital role in the country's administration of justice. The Law Secretary is appointed by the Prime Minister of Pakistan and reports to the Federal Law Minister.

See also
Government of Pakistan
Federal Secretary
Aviation Secretary of Pakistan
Cabinet Secretary of Pakistan
Petroleum Secretary of Pakistan

References

Ministry of Law and Justice (Pakistan)